The Grammy Award for Best Rap Performance is an honor presented to recording artists for quality rap performances. It was first presented at the 31st Annual Grammy Awards in 1989 and again at the 32nd Annual Grammy Awards in 1990, after which point the award was split into two categories: Best Rap Solo Performance and Best Rap Performance by a Duo or Group. These two categories were combined again in 2012 as a result of a restructure of Grammy categories, and the reinstated Award for Best Rap Performance was presented at the 54th Grammy Awards in 2012. The restructuring was the consequence of the Recording Academy's wish to decrease the number of categories and awards and to eliminate distinctions between solo and duo or group performances.

The Grammy Awards, an annual ceremony established in 1958, and originally called the Gramophone Awards, are presented by the National Academy of Recording Arts and Sciences (NARAS) of the United States to "honor artistic achievement, technical proficiency and overall excellence in the recording industry, without regard to album sales or chart position".

The award goes to the artist. The producer, engineer and songwriter can apply for a Winners Certificate.

The first award for Best Rap Performance was presented to DJ Jazzy Jeff & The Fresh Prince (the vocal duo consisting of DJ Jazzy Jeff and Will Smith) for "Parents Just Don't Understand". The ceremony was not without controversy; nominees Jeff and Smith led a boycott in protest of the awards presentation not being televised, and some members of the rap community felt that more qualified artists were overlooked.

American rappers Jay-Z and Kanye West are two-time winners of this award. Kendrick Lamar is a six-time winner.

Background
The Best Rap Performance category was first presented at the 31st Annual Grammy Awards in 1989. NARAS President Mike Green said in Billboard that the music genre has "matured into several kinds of music, with several kinds of artists doing it". Diane Theriot, a representative of the awards department for the academy, recalled being "inundated with eligible rap entries during the first few years of having the category". In 1991, the category was split into the categories Best Rap Solo Performance and Best Rap Performance by a Duo or Group. Recognizing that both categories were continuing to receive numerous entries, the Best Rap Album recognition was established for the 38th Grammy Awards in 1996—the inaugural award was presented to Naughty by Nature for Poverty's Paradise. In 2003, the Best Rap Solo Performance category was divided into separate recognitions for Female and Male Rap Solo Performances. The categories remained separated by gender until 2005 when they were combined into the genderless category originally known as Best Rap Solo Performance. Additional rap categories include Best Rap/Sung Collaboration and Best Rap Song, established in 2002 and 2004, respectively.

History

For the 31st Grammy Awards (1989), Best Rap Performance nominees included DJ Jazzy Jeff & The Fresh Prince for "Parents Just Don't Understand", J. J. Fad for "Supersonic" (from the album of the same name), Kool Moe Dee for "Wild Wild West", LL Cool J for "Going Back to Cali", and Salt-n-Pepa (the duo consisting of Cheryl James and Sandra Denton) for "Push It". The duo known as DJ Jazzy Jeff & The Fresh Prince consisted of DJ Jazzy Jeff (birth name Jeffrey Townes) and actor Will Smith, whose nickname also appeared in the American television sitcom The Fresh Prince of Bel-Air, in which he starred. "Parents Just Don't Understand" appeared on the duo's 1988 album He's the DJ, I'm the Rapper. "Going Back to Cali" appeared on the soundtrack to the film Less than Zero as well as LL Cool J's 1989 studio album Walking with a Panther. Kool Moe Dee's "Wild Wild West" and Salt-n-Pepa's "Push It" appeared on the albums How Ya Like Me Now and Hot, Cool & Vicious, respectively.

Rap and heavy metal categories were introduced the same year (along with Best Bluegrass Album), but, according to the show's producers, time constraints prevented both categories from being televised. Nominee Kool Moe Dee performed during the ceremony, but the rap award was presented during the "usually fast-paced pre-televised ceremony". DJ Jazzy Jeff and Will Smith led a boycott of the ceremony and were joined by fellow nominees LL Cool J and Salt-n-Pepa. Salt-n-Pepa issued the following statement: "If they don't want us, we don't want them." Adding to the controversy surrounding the category, some members of the rap community believed artists such as Big Daddy Kane, KRS-One, and N.W.A (whose debut album Straight Outta Compton "launched gangsta rap") were overlooked. Awards were presented to Jeff and Smith at the Shrine Auditorium in Los Angeles. While Smith was absent from the ceremony, Jeff was present to accept his award. In 2004, Serena Kappes of People magazine ranked Smith's ceremony boycott number eight on its list of Top 10 Grammy Moments. Jeff and Smith were also recognized by the American Music Awards in 1989 with awards for Favorite Rap Artists and Favorite Rap Album, and "Parent's Just Don't Understand" also earned the duo the first MTV Video Music Award for Best Rap Video. Smith later earned Best Rap Solo Performance awards in 1998 for "Men in Black" and 1999 for "Gettin' Jiggy wit It", and was nominated again in 2000 for "Wild Wild West".

Nominees for the 32nd Annual Grammy Awards included De La Soul for "Me Myself and I", DJ Jazzy Jeff & The Fresh Prince for "I Think I Can Beat Mike Tyson", Public Enemy for "Fight the Power", Tone Lōc for "Funky Cold Medina", and Young MC for "Bust a Move". "Me Myself and I" appears on De La Soul's studio album 3 Feet High and Rising and in 2008 was ranked number 46 on VH1's list of the 100 Greatest Hip Hop Songs Ever!!! "I Think I Can Beat Mike Tyson", written by the duo along with Pete Harris, appears on DJ Jazzy Jeff & The Fresh Prince's third album And in This Corner.... "Fight the Power" appeared on the 1988 soundtrack for the film Do the Right Thing and later on Public Enemy's third studio album Fear of a Black Planet (1990). The song ranked number one on VH1's aforementioned list, number 40 on AFI's 100 Years...100 Songs list, and number 322 on Rolling Stone'''s 2004 list of "The 500 Greatest Songs of All Time". "Funky Cold Medina", written by Young MC, Michael L. Ross and Matt Dike, first appeared on Tone Lōc's debut album Lōc-ed After Dark. "Bust a Move" appeared on Young MC's debut album Stone Cold Rhymin'''. Allmusic editor Stephen Thomas Erlewine described the song as "unabashed catchy" due to its "skittish, rhythmic guitar riff, looped beats", backing vocals, and "funny" rhymes. The award was presented to Young MC. In 2010, Joshua Ostroff of Spinner included Young MC's win on his list of "The Grammy Awards' Biggest Mistakes", asserting that "Bust a Move" was merely a "fun little hip-pop song" while "Fight the Power" was a "revelatory single that still stands tall as one of music's greatest (and funkiest) political statements and perhaps hip-hop's finest moment".

Recipients

Artists with multiple wins
6 wins
 Kendrick Lamar

2 wins
 Jay-Z
 Kanye West

Artists with multiple nominations

10 nominations
 Drake

7 nominations
 Kendrick Lamar

6 nominations
 Jay-Z
 Kanye West

5 nominations
 Lil Wayne

4 nominations
 Cardi B
 J. Cole

3 nominations
 Future

2 nominations
 Big Sean
 DaBaby
 DJ Jazzy Jeff & The Fresh Prince
 Eminem
 Megan Thee Stallion
 Nicki Minaj
 2 Chainz
 Nipsey Hussle
 Young Thug

See also

 History of hip hop music

References

General
  Note: User must select the "Rap" category as the genre under the search feature.
 

Specific

Further reading

External links
Official site of the Grammy Awards
Video: 32nd Annual Grammy Awards – Best Rap Performance
 
 

 
1989 establishments in the United States
Awards established in 1989
Rap Performance